The London Film Critics' Circle is the name by which the Film Section of The Critics' Circle is known internationally.

The word London was added because it was thought the term Critics' Circle Film Awards did not convey the full context of the awards' origins; the LFCC wished its annual Awards to be recognised on film advertising, especially in the United States, and in production notes.

The Critics' Circle, founded in 1913, is an association for working British critics. Film critics first became eligible for membership of the Circle in 1926. The Film section now has more than 180 members drawn from publications, broadcast media and the internet throughout the United Kingdom.

Film section members of the Critics' Circle will have worked as critics—writing informed analytical features or broadcasting programmes about film for British publications and media—for at least two years, earning income from reviewing and writing about film.

Critics' Circle Film Awards
The Critics' Circle Film Awards were instituted in 1980 and are awarded annually by the Film Section of the Critics' Circle.

Voted for by all members of the Film Section, the awards have become a major event in London, presented at a dinner dance held in a large West End hotel. From 1995 to 2010 the awards ceremony was a charity event in aid of the National Society for the Prevention of Cruelty to Children (NSPCC).

Award categories
Over the years, the Award categories have gradually changed with some categories being added and others dropped. For some categories this means that winners were not necessarily declared or listed in each of the Awards year.

In 2007, it was decided that Irish filmmakers, actors and others involved in the film industry would be eligible in what had previously been called "British" award categories. To that end, the titles of several of the awards were amended as "British/Irish".

Special awards include: The Attenborough Award, which goes to the British/Irish film of the year; The Philip French Award, which goes to the breakthrough British/Irish filmmaker of the year, and The Dilys Powell Award, which is awarded for excellence in cinema.

Past and present award categories include:
Film of the Year (1980–present)
Foreign Language Film of the Year (1980–present)
Director of the Year (1980–present)
Screenwriter of the Year (1980–present)
Actor of the Year
Actress of the Year
Supporting Actor of the Year
Supporting Actress of the Year
International Newcomer of the Year
The Attenborough Award: British/Irish Film of the Year
British or Irish Film of the Year (1991–present)
British or Irish Director of the Year
British or Irish Screenwriter of the Year
British or Irish Producer of the Year
Technical Achievement of the Year (2011-present)
British/Irish Actor of the Year
British/Irish Actress of the Year
The Dilys Powell Award for Excellence in Cinema
Young British/Irish Performer of the Year
Breakthrough British/Irish Filmmaker

Awards ceremonies

1986–1990 winners

1986 winners
Actor of the Year (TIE)
William Hurt – Kiss of the Spider Woman
Bob Hoskins – Mona Lisa
Screenwriter of the Year
Woody Allen – Hannah and Her Sisters
Director of the Year
Akira Kurosawa – Ran
Film of the Year
A Room with a View

1987 winners
Actor of the Year (TIE)
Sean Connery – The Untouchables
Gary Oldman – Prick Up Your Ears
Screenwriter of the Year
Alan Bennett – Prick Up Your Ears
Director of the Year
Stanley Kubrick – Full Metal Jacket
Film of the Year
Hope and Glory

1988 winners
Actor of the Year (TIE)
Stephane Audran – Babette's Feast
Leo McKern – Travelling North
Screenwriter of the Year
David Mamet – House of Games
Director of the Year
John Huston – The Dead
Film of the Year
House of Games

1989 winners
Actor of the Year
Daniel Day-Lewis – My Left Foot
Screenwriter of the Year
Christopher Hampton – Dangerous Liaisons
Director of the Year
Terence Davies – Distant Voices, Still Lives
Film of the Year
Distant Voices, Still Lives

1990 winners
Actor of the Year
Philippe Noiret – Cinema Paradiso
Screenwriter of the Year
Woody Allen – Crimes and Misdemeanors
Director of the Year
Woody Allen – Crimes and Misdemeanors
Film of the Year
Crimes and Misdemeanors

1991–1996 winners

1991 winners
Actor of the Year
Gérard Depardieu – Cyrano de Bergerac
Actress of the Year
Susan Sarandon – Thelma & Louise, White Palace
British Actor of the Year
Alan Rickman – Close My Eyes, Truly, Madly, Deeply, Quigley Down Under, Robin Hood: Prince of Thieves
British Director of the Year
Alan Parker – The Commitments
British Screenwriter of the Year
Dick Clement, Ian La Frenais, Roddy Doyle – The Commitments
British Film of the Year
Life Is Sweet
Screenwriter of the Year
David Mamet – Homicide
Director of the Year
Ridley Scott – Thelma & Louise
Film of the Year
Thelma & Louise

1992 winners
Actor of the Year
Robert Downey Jr. – Chaplin
Actress of the Year
Judy Davis – Husbands and Wives, Barton Fink, Naked Lunch
British Actor of the Year
Daniel Day-Lewis – The Last of the Mohicans
British Director of the Year
Neil Jordan – The Crying Game
British Film of the Year
Howards End
British Screenwriter of the Year
Neil Jordan – The Crying Game
Director of the Year
Robert Altman – The Player
Film of the Year
Unforgiven
Newcomer of the Year
Baz Luhrmann – Strictly Ballroom
Screenwriter of the Year
Michael Tolkin – The Player

1993 winners
Actor of the Year
Anthony Hopkins – The Remains of the Day
Actress of the Year
Holly Hunter – The Piano
British Actor of the Year
David Thewlis – Naked
British Actress of the Year
Miranda Richardson – Fatale
British Director of the Year
Ken Loach – Raining Stones
British Film of the Year
The Remains of the Day
British Screenwriter of the Year
Roddy Doyle – The Snapper
Director of the Year
James Ivory – The Remains of the Day
Film of the Year
The Piano
Newcomer of the Year
Quentin Tarantino – Reservoir Dogs
Screenwriter of the Year
Harold Ramis, Danny Rubin – Groundhog Day
Special Award
Kate Maberly – The Secret Garden

1994 winners
Actor of the Year
John Travolta – Pulp Fiction
Actress of the Year
Linda Fiorentino – The Last Seduction
British Actor of the Year
Ralph Fiennes – Schindler's List
British Actress of the Year
Crissy Rock – Ladybird, Ladybird
British Director of the Year
Mike Newell – Four Weddings and a Funeral
British Film of the Year
Four Weddings and a Funeral
British Producer of the Year
Duncan Kenworthy – Four Weddings and a Funeral
British Screenwriter of the Year
Richard Curtis – Four Weddings and a Funeral
Director of the Year
Steven Spielberg – Schindler's List
Film of the Year
Schindler's List
Newcomer of the Year
Jim Carrey – The Mask, Ace Ventura: Pet Detective
Screenwriter of the Year
Quentin Tarantino – Pulp Fiction
Special Award
Hugh Grant – Four Weddings and a Funeral

1995 winners
Actor of the Year
Johnny Depp – Ed Wood, Don Juan DeMarco
Actress of the Year
Nicole Kidman – To Die For
British Actor of the Year
Nigel Hawthorne – The Madness of King George
British Actress of the Year
Kate Winslet – Heavenly Creatures
British Director of the Year
Michael Radford – Il Postino: The Postman
British Film of the Year
The Madness of King George
British Newcomer of the Year
Danny Boyle – Shallow Grave
British Screenwriter of the Year
Alan Bennett – The Madness of King George
Director of the Year
Peter Jackson – Heavenly Creatures
Film of the Year
Babe
Screenwriter of the Year
Paul Attanasio – Quiz Show, Disclosure

1996 winners
Actor of the Year
Morgan Freeman – Seven
Actress of the Year
Frances McDormand – Fargo
British Actor of the Year
Ian McKellen – Richard III
Ewan McGregor – Trainspotting, Brassed Off, Emma, The Pillow Book
British Actress of the Year
Brenda Blethyn – Secrets & Lies
British Director of the Year
Mike Leigh – Secrets & Lies
British Newcomer of the Year
Emily Watson – Breaking the Waves
British Producer of the Year
Andrew Macdonald – Trainspotting
British Screenwriter of the Year
Emma Thompson – Sense and Sensibility
Director of the Year
Joel Coen – Fargo
Film of the Year
Secrets & Lies
Screenwriter of the Year
Joel Coen and Ethan Coen – Fargo

References

External links
Official website
London Critics' Circle Film Awards at the Internet Movie Database

British film awards
British film critics associations
Cinema of London